Roldani Baldwin (born March 16, 1996) is a Dominican professional baseball catcher for the High Point Rockers of the Atlantic League of Professional Baseball. He signed with the Boston Red Sox as an international free agent in 2013 and played for their organization until 2022. He won the bronze medal with the Dominican Republic national baseball team in the 2020 Summer Olympics.

Career

Boston Red Sox
On November 25, 2013, Baldwin signed with the Boston Red Sox organization as an international free agent. He made his professional debut with the Dominican Summer League Red Sox in 2014, hitting .269 in 65 games.

In 2015, Baldwin split the season between the rookie-level GCL Red Sox and the Low-A Lowell Spinners, slashing .288/.359/.399 in 50 games between the two teams. The following season, Baldwin split the year between the Single-A Greenville Drive and Lowell, accumulating a .266/.305/.372 batting line with 4 home runs and 37 RBI. In 2017, Baldwin returned to Greenville, logging a .274/.310/.489 slash with career-highs in home runs (14) and RBI (66). For the 2018 season, Baldwin played for the High-A Salem Red Sox, slashing .233/.282/.371 with 7 home runs and 27 RBI. Baldwin only appeared in eight games between Lowell and the GCL Red Sox in 2019, missing much of the year with a broken ankle.

The Red Sox invited Baldwin to spring training in 2020, but he did not play in a game in 2020 due to the cancellation of the minor league season because of the COVID-19 pandemic. He was assigned to the Double-A Portland Sea Dogs to begin the 2021 season. Baldwin elected free agency following the season, but later re-signed with the Red Sox on a minor league deal on February 1, 2022. He played for the Triple-A Worcester Red Sox until he was released on August 5, 2022.

High Point Rockers
On August 16, 2022, Baldwin signed with the High Point Rockers of the Atlantic League of Professional Baseball.

International career
Baldwin was named to the Dominican Republic national baseball team for Baseball at the 2020 Summer Olympics, contested in Tokyo in 2021. The Dominican Republic took third place in the tournament, winning the bronze medal.

References

External links

Living people
Dominican Republic expatriate baseball players in the United States
1996 births
Dominican Summer League Red Sox players
Gulf Coast Red Sox players
Lowell Spinners players
Greenville Drive players
Salem Red Sox players
Portland Sea Dogs players
Baseball players at the 2020 Summer Olympics
Medalists at the 2020 Summer Olympics
Olympic medalists in baseball
Olympic bronze medalists for the Dominican Republic
Olympic baseball players of the Dominican Republic